The Elstar apple is an apple cultivar that was first developed in the Netherlands in Elst in the 1950s by crossing Golden Delicious and Ingrid Marie apples. It quickly became popular, especially in Europe and was first introduced to America in 1972. It remains popular in Continental Europe, but less so in the United Kingdom.

The Elstar is a medium-sized apple whose skin is mostly red with yellow showing. The flesh is white and has a crispy texture. It may be used for cooking and is especially good for making apple sauce. In general, however, it is used in desserts due to its sweet flavour.

Descendant cultivars
Santana (Elstar × Priscilla)
Ecolette (Elstar × Prima)
Collina (Priscilla × Elstar)

Disease susceptibility
Scab: high
Powdery mildew: high
Cedar apple rust: high

References

External links
Orange Pippin - Elstar
Elstar produce profile
National Fruit Collection page

Apple cultivars
Dutch inventions
Dutch apples